Dui Jibon is a 1988 Bangladeshi drama film directed by Abdullah al Mamun, who also wrote the story. The screenplay and dialogue is written by Jahirul Haque. The film stars Bulbul Ahmed, Kabori Sarwar, Afzal Hossain, Parveen Sultana Diti in leading roles with Neepa Monalisa, Tina Khan, Jahirul Haque, Adil, Amol Bose, Minu Rahman Minoti in supporting roles. In 1988, the film won Bangladesh National Film Award for the best film and another 5 categories.

Cast 
 Bulbul Ahmed as Mustafa
 Kabori Sarwar as Tahmina
 Afzal Hossain as Robin 
 Diti as Moushumi
 Nipa Monalisa as Kulsum
 Tina Khan as Dayana
 Zahirul Haque as Tahmina's Father
 Adil as Rayhan
 Amol Bose
 Minu Rahman as Mustafa's Mother
 Minoti Hossain
 Monowara

Music 
Dui Jibon's music is directed by Alam Khan. Song lyrics are by Moniruzzman Moni. The songs are performed by Sabina Yasmin, Syed Abdul Hadi, Andrew Kishore, Runa Laila, and Shamima Yasmin Diba. Most of the songs of this film became popular.

Track listing

Awards

National Film Awards
 Won: Best Films - Suchana Films
 Won: Best Director - Abdullah al Mamun
 Won: Best Lyricist - Manirujjaman Monir
 Won: Best Femele Playback Singer - Sabina Yasmin
 Won: Best Screenplay - Abdullah al Mamun
 Won: Best Art Editor - Atikur Rahman Mollik

References

External links

 

1988 films
Bengali-language Bangladeshi films
Bangladeshi drama films
Films scored by Alam Khan
1980s Bengali-language films
Best Film National Film Award (Bangladesh) winners
Films whose writer won the Best Screenplay National Film Award (Bangladesh)
1988 drama films